Koen Weuts (born 18 September 1990) is a Belgian professional footballer who plays as a left back for Lyra-Lierse Berlaar in the Belgian Third Amateur Division.

Career
Before joining OH Leuven, Weuts played with youth teams of Lyra and Lierse. At only 16 years of age, he played his first official senior match for Lierse against Antwerp. In 2007, he was also part of the Belgium squad at the 2007 FIFA U-17 World Cup, together with players such as Eden Hazard and Christian Benteke. He moved to Oud-Heverlee Leuven in August 2009 and was part of the team that achieved promotion to the Belgian Pro League in 2011. In 2013, Weuts was released bu OHL and moved to Helmond Sport in the Eerste Divisie.

Koen's older brother Kurt Weuts is also a professional footballer and played together with him for Oud-Heverlee Leuven until 2011.

External links
 Voetbal International profile 
 
 

1990 births
Living people
Belgian footballers
Belgian Pro League players
Challenger Pro League players
Lierse S.K. players
Oud-Heverlee Leuven players
Helmond Sport players
Eerste Divisie players
Belgian expatriate footballers
Expatriate footballers in the Netherlands
Belgian expatriate sportspeople in the Netherlands
Belgium youth international footballers
Belgium under-21 international footballers
Association football forwards
RWDM47 players
People from Lier, Belgium
Footballers from Antwerp Province